Short end of the stick may refer to:
Tally stick
Short End of the Stick (TV series), a 2016 Hong Kong TVB drama